Acleris rosella is a species of moth of the family Tortricidae. It is found in China.

The wingspan is about 13 mm.

The larvae feed on Rosa acicularis.

References

Moths described in 1987
rosella
Moths of Asia